Highbury Park is a street in Highbury, London, that runs from Blackstock Road in the north to Highbury Grove in the south.

Buildings
The late nineteenth century Highbury Barn public house refers in its name to the 18th century tea gardens that became a "pleasure resort" in the nineteenth century.

See also
Highbury New Park

References

External links 

Highbury
Streets in the London Borough of Islington